Nuggets, Vol. 9: Acid Rock is a compilation album released by Rhino Records.  It's the ninth in its series of twelve albums highlighting various music genres.

Track listing
 "7 and 7 Is" - Love – 2:15
 "Eight Miles High" - The Byrds – 3:34
 "Feelings" - The Grass Roots – 2:57
 "Just Dropped In (To See What Condition My Condition Was In)" - The First Edition – 3:20
 "Magic Carpet Ride" - Steppenwolf – 4:27
 "It's Wonderful" - The Young Rascals – 3:21
 "Porpoise Song" - The Monkees – 4:10
 "She's My Girl" - The Turtles – 2:35
 "Incense and Peppermints" - The Strawberry Alarm Clock – 2:47
 "The Wind Blows Her Hair" - The Seeds – 2:30
 "You Keep Me Hangin' On" - Vanilla Fudge – 2:59
 "In-A-Gadda-Da-Vida" - Iron Butterfly – 2:53
 "Time Has Come Today" - The Chambers Brothers – 3:52
 "I Won't Hurt You" - The West Coast Pop Art Experimental Band – 2:24

Nuggets series albums
1985 compilation albums
Acid rock compilation albums